This is a list of notable frozen custard companies that manufacture or purvey frozen custard. Frozen custard is a cold dessert similar to ice cream, but includes a significant amount of eggs, and it typically has a denser consistency.

Frozen custard companies

 Abbott's Frozen Custard – a franchise founded and based in Rochester, New York
 Andy's Frozen Custard – a restaurant chain with locations in fourteen U.S. states
 Carvel – an ice cream franchise owned by Focus Brands
 Crater Frozen Custard - made by Crater Cafe LLC, Central Point, Oregon
 Culver's – a casual fast food restaurant chain that operates primarily in the Midwestern United States
 Double Rainbow — based in San Francisco
 Freddy's Frozen Custard & Steakburgers – an American fast-casual restaurant chain based in Wichita, Kansas.
 Gilles Frozen Custard – a brand of frozen custard that originated at the Gilles Frozen Custard Stand established in 1938, it is the oldest frozen custard stand in Milwaukee, Wisconsin
 Good Times Burgers & Frozen Custard 
 Goodberry's Frozen Custard - based in North Carolina
 Kopp's Frozen Custard – a restaurant chain located in the Milwaukee, Wisconsin area that specializes in frozen custard and large "jumbo" hamburgers
 Leon's Frozen Custard – a family-owned drive-in established in 1942 and located in Milwaukee, Wisconsin.
 Meadows Frozen Custard
 Rita's Italian Ice
 Shake Shack – an American fast casual restaurant chain based in New York City
 Shake's Frozen Custard 
 Ted Drewes – a family-owned frozen custard company in St. Louis, Missouri
 Tom Wahl's 
 Zesto Drive-In

See also
 Lists of companies
 List of dairy product companies in the United States

References

 
Corporation-related lists